is a television drama series, broadcast by TBS from April to June 2009. Jun Matsumoto plays the lead role of Vito, a half-Filipino, half-Japanese man who always smiles despite all of the problems and difficulties he faces. The series focused on foreigners and mixed race children who suffered from racism.

Synopsis
Vito Hayakawa has a Filipino father and a Japanese mother, but he was born and raised in Japan and has never visited the Philippines. The ever-smiling Vito works at Machimura Foods during the day, and at night, he works a part-time job trying to make his dreams come true. One day during an incident at a book store, he meets a girl named Hana Mishima, who lost her ability to speak due to an accident. But even though she can't speak, Vito is drawn to her beautiful smile. However, Vito becomes wrongly suspected by the police for a crime, and after meeting the lawyer Kazuma Ito, the issue begins to grow... Together, Vito, Hana, and Kazuma will go through challenging times and have to overcome many obstacles.

Cast
Jun Matsumoto as Vito Hayakawa
Yui Aragaki as Hana Mishima
Eiko Koike as Shiori Machimura
Hidenori Tokuyama as Kinta Kawai
Suzunosuke as Kenji Kazima
Hiroyuki Ikeuchi as Detective Takayanagi
Kiichi Nakai as Kazuma Ito
Masanobu Katsumura as Keisuke Kashiwagi
Gin Maeda as Sosuke Machimura
Ayumi Ishida as Midori Machimura
Toshiyuki Kitami as Detective Furuse
Shun Oguri as Seiji Hayashi

Awards and nominations

13th Nikkan Sports Drama Grand Prix

Spring Awards 2009
 Best Drama: Smile
 Best Actor: Jun Matsumoto
 Best Supporting Actor: Kiichi Nakai
 Best Supporting Actress: Yui Aragaki

See also 
Hana Yori Dango
Arashi
Bambino!
Gokusen
Filipinos in Japan

References

External links
 

Kin'yō Dorama
2009 Japanese television series debuts
2009 Japanese television series endings
Television shows written by Eriko Shinozaki
TBS Television (Japan) dramas